Myristica ceylanica is a species of plant in the family Myristicaceae. It is endemic to Sri Lanka.

References

Flora of Sri Lanka
ceylanica
Vulnerable plants
Taxonomy articles created by Polbot
Plants described in 1855